Leslie James Reynolds (3 June 1899 – 10 May 1985) was an Australian rules footballer who played for St Kilda in the Victorian Football League (VFL) during the early 1920s.

A Swimming Club recruit, Reynolds was the uncle of Essendon champion Dick Reynolds. He officiated in three games as a field umpire in the 1929 VFL season, one of which was a loss to his former club St Kilda, resulting in their supporters surrounding the umpires rooms afterwards.

References
Holmesby, Russell and Main, Jim (2007). The Encyclopedia of AFL Footballers. 7th ed. Melbourne: Bas Publishing.

External links

1899 births
St Kilda Football Club players
Australian Football League umpires
Australian rules footballers from Melbourne
1985 deaths
People from North Melbourne